"Southern Freeez" produced by John Rocca was the first single released by British dance band Freeez from their debut album, also entitled Southern Freeez. The album was self-funded by member John Rocca and initially released on his Pink Rhythm record label before the group was signed to Beggars Banquet.

Song information
Freeez gained far higher recognition and sales with this record than with the previous singles "Keep in Touch" (which reached number 49 in the UK sales charts)and its follow-up "Stay"/"Hot Footing It". "Southern Freeez" reached number one in the blues and soul chart and spent two weeks at number 8 of the UK Singles Chart during early 1981 

Guest Ingrid Mansfield Allman provided vocals. The titular Southern Freeez is attested to derive from a dance move, "The Freeze," used by clubbers in the "Royalty" club, Southgate in the early 1980s. A then-popular song, "The Groove" by Rodney Franklin, has moments where the band drops out for a bar, and a style of freezing movement at these points took hold.

Remix

In 1987, the song was remixed and re-released by the label Total Control. The remix reached number No. 63 in the UK Singles Chart.

Cover versions
UK soul singer Beverley Knight covered "Southern Freeez" for her 2011 album Soul UK. A cover also appeared on the album Brasil Bam Bam Bam (2014) by Sonzeira, a band formed by Gilles Peterson with Emanuelle Araujo and Valerie Etienne on vocals.

Track listing

UK single (1981 version)
 "Southern Freeez" - 5:40
 "Southern Freeez (LP Version)"

UK single (1987 version)
 "Southern Freeez (Dance Mix)"
 "Southern Freeez (Avenger Mix)"
 "Southern Freeez (7" Edit)"

Charts

1981

1987

Credits

Production
John Rocca

Musicians
John Rocca (percussion, vocals)
Peter Maas (bass)
Andy Stennet (keyboards)
Paul Morgan (drums)
Gordon Sullivan (electric guitar)
Ingrid Mansfield Allman (vocals)

Song
Written by John Rocca, Peter Maas and Andrew Stennett

See also
Freeez discography
List of post-disco artists and songs

References

External links
 Freeez [ on] AMG.com
 Biography about Freeez

1981 singles
Freeez songs
Post-disco songs
Funk songs
1981 songs
Beggars Banquet Records singles